This is a discography for the contemporary Christian music artist Carman.

Studio albums

Compilation albums
 1990: Christmas with Carman (EMI-Capitol)
 1992: Lord of All: Songs of Carman
 1993: The Absolute Best (Sparrow) (certified Platinum)
 1993: 36 All-Time Greatest Hits (Sparrow)
 1996: Carman's Yo Kidz! The Hitz (Everland)
 1996: Lo Mejor — The Best
 1997: The Best of the Early Years (Vol. 1 and Vol. 2) (Harmony)
 2000: Heart of a Champion (Sparrow)
 2007: The Ultimate Collection (EMI)
 2008: Greatest Hits (Sparrow)
 2013: Anthems of a Champion (Sparrow)
 2014: Millennium Collection - 20th Century Masters: The Best of Carman (Sparrow)
 2021: Remembering: Carman

Singles

Appearances on other albums
1986: Janet Paschal - I Give You Jesus - "His Name is Life" Duet (Shiloh Records)
1993: The New Young Messiah "Glory to God in the Highest"
1995: Christmas Carols of The Young Messiah "For Unto You"
1997: Kathy Troccoli - Love and Mercy "Love One Another" (with various guest artists)
1998: The Prince of Egypt [Inspirational] "God Will Take Care of Me"
1998: Vestal & Friends Vestal Goodman "Oh, Happy Day"

Filmography

Movies and television
 1989: Carman: Celebrate Jesus TBN Special
 1992: Commander Kellie and the Superkids: The Intruder as young singer named Mario
 1995–97: Time 2 – variety series on TBN
 1996: R.I.O.T.: The Movie as Victor Rizzo
 1997: Carman's Classic Hymns Special TBN Special
 1998: Carman Halloween 3:16 TBN Special
 2001: Carman: The Champion as Orlando Leone
 2003: Bobby Jones Gospel; one episode
 2007: Carman's Reality Check – variety series on TBN (also writer and producer)
 2009: The Book of Ruth: Journey of Faith as Boaz
 2010: Changing Hands as Frankie
 2013: Final: The Rapture as Frankie

Music videos

Long form
 1985: Comin' On Strong Live
 1988: Carman Live: Radically Saved
 1990: Revival in the Land
 1992: Addicted to Jesus
 1993: The Standard
 1994: Carman's Yo Kidz! The Vidz
 1995: Raising the Standard: Live
 1998: Absolute Best Videos
 1998: Mission 3:16: The Video
 2001: Carman in Concert: One Night Only
 2003: Carman: House of Praise – Live

Short form
 "A Little Bit More Conviction" from The Champion
 "I Got the Joy" (featuring Carlton Pearson) from Revival in the Land
 "A Witch's Invitation" from Revival in the Land
 "The Resurrection Rap" from Revival in the Land
 "Revival in the Land" from Revival in the Land
 "Our Turn Now" (featuring Petra) from Addicted to Jesus
 "Satan, Bite the Dust" from Addicted to Jesus
 "1955" from Addicted to Jesus
 "Addicted to Jesus" (featuring dc Talk) from Addicted to Jesus
 "Who's in the House" from The Standard
 "Great God" from The Standard
 "Sunday School Rock" from The Standard
 "Holdin' On" (featuring Margaret Becker) from The Standard
 "America Again" from The Standard
 "Serve the Lord" (featuring David Foster on piano) from The Absolute Best
 "Meant for This Moment" (featuring Helen Baylor) from Yo Kidz! 2: The Armor of God
 "God Is Exalted" from R.I.O.T. (Righteous Invasion of Truth)
 "R.I.O.T. (Righteous Invasion of Truth)" from R.I.O.T. (Righteous Invasion of Truth)
 "My Story" from R.I.O.T. (Righteous Invasion of Truth)
 "No Monsters" from R.I.O.T. (Righteous Invasion of Truth)
 "7 Ways 2 Praise" from R.I.O.T. (Righteous Invasion of Truth)
 "Step of Faith" (featuring Ricky Skaggs) from R.I.O.T. (Righteous Invasion of Truth)
 "There Is a God" from R.I.O.T. (Righteous Invasion of Truth)
 "Amen" from R.I.O.T. (Righteous Invasion of Truth)
 "Mission 3:16" from Mission 3:16
 "Jesus Is the Lamb" from Mission 3:16
 "The Courtroom" from Mission 3:16
 "We Are Not Ashamed" from Mission 3:16
 "The Prayer Anthem" from Mission 3:16
 "Slam" from Mission 3:16
 "Faith Enough" from Heart of a Champion
 "The Flag" from Anthems of a Champion

References

Discographies of American artists
Christian music discographies